Čudno Selo is a settlement on the right bank of the Lahinja River in the Municipality of Črnomelj in the White Carniola area of southeastern Slovenia. The area is part of the traditional region of Lower Carniola and is now included in the Southeast Slovenia Statistical Region.

Name
The name Čudno selo has been explained as derived from the word čud 'giant'. If so, the name would literally mean 'giant's village'. In the past, the village was known as Tschudnofeld in German.

References

External links
Čudno Selo on Geopedia

Populated places in the Municipality of Črnomelj